The Civil Services refer to the career government civil servants who are the permanent executive branch of the Republic of India. Elected cabinet ministers determine policy, and civil servants carry it out.

Central Civil Servants are employees of the Government of India or of the states, but not all employees of the Government are civil servants. As of 2010, there were 6.4 million government employees in India but fewer than 50,000 civil servants to administer them.

The agencies with the most personnel are with the Central Secretariat Service and Indian Revenue Service (IT and C&CE). The Government of India approved the formation of Indian Skill Development Service in 2015, and the Indian Enterprise Development Service in 2016. Further, the Cabinet of India approved merging all the central civil services under Indian Railways which are Indian Railway Accounts Service, Indian Railway Traffic Service, Indian Railway Personnel Service and Railway Protection Force Service into a single Indian Railways Management Service as part of a structural reform in the sector in 2019.

Civil servants in a personal capacity are paid from the Civil List. Article 311 of the constitution protects civil servants from politically motivated or vindictive action. Senior civil servants may be called to account by the Parliament. The civil service system in India is rank-based and does not follow the tenets of the position-based civil services.

History

British Colonial era 

The present civil services of India are mainly based on the pattern of the former Indian Civil Service of British India.

During the British raj, Warren Hastings laid the foundation of civil service and Charles Cornwallis reformed, modernised, and rationalised it. Hence, Charles Cornwallis is known as 'the Father of civil service in India'.

Cornwallis introduced two divisions of the Indian Civil service—covenanted and uncovenanted. The covenanted civil service consisted of only Europeans (i.e., British personnel) occupying the higher posts in the government. The uncovenanted civil service was solely introduced to facilitate the entry of Indians at the lower rung of the administration.

With the passing of the Government of India Act 1919, the Imperial Services headed by the Secretary of State for India were split into two—the All India Services and the Central Services.

The All India and Central Services (Group A) were designated as Central Superior Services as early as 1924. From 1924 to 1934, the administration of India consisted of 10 All India Services (including Indian Education Service, Indian Medical Service) and 5 central departments, all under the control of the Secretary of State for India, and 3 central departments under joint Provincial and Imperial Control.

Modern era
The present modern civil service was formed after the partition of India in 1947. It was Sardar Patel's vision that the civil service should strengthen cohesion and national unity. The values of integrity, impartiality, and merit remain the guiding principles of the Indian civil services.

By the early 21st century, especially in Indian media, Indian civil servants were regularly colloquially called 'babus' (as in 'the rule of babus'), while Indian bureaucracy is called 'babudom'.

The Ministry of Personnel, Public Grievances and Pensions, located in New Delhi, is unofficially the 'Ministry of Civil Services'. The Ministry is responsible for training, reforms and pensions for the civil service system in India.

Present framework

Constitutional provision 
The Constitution, under Article 312 gives authority to the Rajya Sabha (the upper house of Parliament) to set up new branches of the All India Services with a two-thirds majority vote. The Indian Administrative Service, Indian Police Service, and Indian Forest Service have been established under this constitutional provision.

Guiding principals

Values
A member of the civil service in discharge of his/her functions is to be guided by maintaining absolute integrity, allegiance to the constitution and the law of the nation, patriotism, national pride, devotion to duty, honesty, impartiality and transparency.

Code of ethics
The Government of India promotes values and a certain standard of ethics of requiring and facilitating every civil servant:
 To discharge official duty with responsibility, honesty, accountability and without discrimination.
 To ensure effective management, leadership development and personal growth.
 To avoid misuse of official position or information.
 To serve as instruments of good governance and foster social and economic development.

Responsibilities

The responsibility of the civil services is to run the administration of India. The country is managed through a number of central government agencies in accordance with policy directions from the ministries. Civil servants are the actual makers of Indian law and policy. They work on behalf of the elected government and cannot publicly show their disinterest or disapproval for it. It is mandatory for them to form certain rules and policies according to the government's views and interests. However, they cannot be removed by any state or central government, but can only be retired.

Among the members of the civil services are administrators in the central government and state government; emissaries in the foreign missions/embassies; tax collectors and revenue commissioners; civil service commissioned police officers; permanent representative(s) and employees in the United Nations and its agencies; and chairmen, managing directors, and full-time functional directors and members of the board of various public-sector undertakings, enterprises, corporations, banks, and financial institutions. Civil servants are employed to various agencies of India and can also be appointed as advisors, special duty officers, or private secretaries to ministers of the Union and the State Government.

Staffing

Head of the Civil Services

The highest ranking civil servant is the Cabinet Secretary. They are ex-officio Chairman of the Civil Services Board; the chief of the Indian Administrative Service and head of all civil services under the rules of business of the Government of India. They also hold the 11th position in the Order of Precedence of India.

The position holder is accountable for ensuring that the Civil Service is equipped with the skills and capability to meet the everyday challenges it faces and that civil servants work in a fair and decent environment.

Entry level recruitment 
Civil Services Board is responsible for the entry level recruitment and subsequent job promotions below the rank of Joint Secretary to Government of India. The recruits are university graduates or above selected through the following rigorous system of specialisation-based examinations for recruitment into respective specialised departments:

 Civil Services Examination (Civil Service)
National Defence Academy Examination (Defence Service)
Combined Defence Service Examination (Defence Service)
 Combined Geo-Scientist Examination (Natural Resource)
 Engineering Services Examination (Engineering)
 Indian Economic Service/Indian Statistical Service Examination (I.E.S./I.S.S. Exam) (Civil Service)
 Indian Cost Accounts Service (ICoAS) Examination (Civil Service)
 Combined Medical Services Examination (Medical)
 Central Armed Police Forces - Assistant Commandants Examination (CAPF - AC Exam) of Union Public Service Commission (UPSC) for Group A posts (Civil Service)

Promotions and appointments to higher ranks 
All appointments in the rank of Joint Secretary to Government of India and above, other major appointments, empanelment, and extension of tenure are done by the Appointments Committee of the Cabinet. Lower appointments are handled by the Civil Services Board.

Central Administrative Tribunal 
For settling various administrative disputes the Central Administrative Tribunal (CAT) can be approached. For instance, citizens can approach CAT to obtain the permission to sue corrupt or inept civil servants, and civil servants can approach CAT for unfair dismissal.

Civil Services Day

The Civil Service Day is celebrated on 21 April every year. The purpose for this day is to rededicate and recommit themselves to the cause of the people. It is observed by all Civil Services. This day gives civil servants the opportunity for introspection and thinking about future strategies to deal with the challenges being posed by the changing times.

This date (21 April) was chosen to commemorate the day in 1947 when Sardar Vallabhbhai Patel, the first Home Minister of Independent India, addressed the probationers of Administrative Services Officers.

On this occasion, all officers of Central and State Governments are honoured for excellence in public administration by the Prime Minister of India. The 'Prime Minister's Awards for Excellence in Public Administration' is presented in three categories. Under this scheme of awards instituted in 2006, all the officers individually or as group or as organisation are eligible.

Types of Higher Government Jobs 

The Union Civil  Services of India can be classified into two types - the All India Civil Services and the Central Civil Services (Group A). Additionally, the officers from the State Civil  Services cadre can seek deployment with the Government of India cadre for the Union Civil Services jobs.

All India Services
All appointments to All India Civil Services are made by the President of India.
 Indian Administrative Service 
 Indian Forest Service 
 Indian Police Service

Central Services

Group A
The Central Civil Services (Group A) are concerned with the administration of the Union Government. All appointments to Central Civil Services (Group A) are made by the President of India.

Group B 
For Group B central civil service posts, the Combined Graduate Level Examination (CGLE) is conducted by the Staff Selection Commission (SSC).
All appointments to Group B are made by the authorities specified by a general or special order of the President.

State Services 
The State Civil Services examinations and recruitment are conducted by the individual states' public service commissions in India. These services are feeder services of All India Services.
All appointments to State Services (Group A) are made by the Governors of States.

Group A

State Administrative Service (Civil Services)   

All State Administrative Services officers in India are state civil servants posted as Assistant Collector cum Subdistrict Magistrate in various sub districts of India, Ward  Officer in various municipal corporations, notified area councils,  municipal councils,   district parishads, block  parishads and  village panchayats and Under Secretary in various state secretariats. They belong to Group 'B' rank  and part of state civil services of India. The officers of following state civil services cadre are later promoted to Indian Administrative Service.

All India Judicial Service, All India Legal Service, State Regional Legal Service,  Central Legal Service and State Legal Service  (Law)
All India Judicial Services, All India Legal Service,  State Regional Legal Service, Central Legal Service and State Legal Service are equivalent to civil services and defence services. Their appointment made by Governor of respective states after the consultation / approval of the respective states High Courts and President of India in case the appointment is made for Supreme Court of India and central government establishments.

List of State Engineering Services (Engineering)

All State Engineering Services officers  are Group 'A’ gazetted officers.

State Forest Service (Natural Resource) 
All ‘ State Forest Services’ of the rank of Assistant Conservator of Forest(ACF) are Group 'B' gazetted officers under state natural resource services. The officers of this state natural resource services are later promoted to the Indian Forest Service after 8 years of Service.

State Police Service (Civil Service) 
All State Police Services of the rank of Deputy Superintendent of Police/Assistant Commissioner of Police/Assistant Commandant  are Group 'B' Officers and is included under state civil services . The officers of following state civil services are later promoted to Indian Police Service.

Group B 
The state civil services (Group B) deal with subjects such as land revenue, agriculture, forests, education etc. The officers are recruited by different States through the respective State Public Service Commissions, and appointed by the Governor of that state.
 Sub Divisional Officer (S.D.O.) of various departments (Civil Service)
 Assistant Registrar Cooperative Societies (Civil Service)
 Block Development Officer (Civil Service)
 District Employment Officer (D.E.O.) (Civil Service)
 District Food and Supplies Controller/Officer (D.F.S.O.) (Civil Service)
 District Treasury Officer (S.T.O.) (Civil Service)
 District Welfare Officer (D.W.O.) (Civil Service)
 Excise and Taxation Officer (E.T.O.) (Civil Service)
Tehsildar/Talukadar/Assistant Collector (Civil Service)
 Forest Range Officer (F.R.O.) (Natural Resource)
 Any other Class-I/Class-II service notified as per rules by the concerned State, i.e. officers, lecturers, assistants, associate professors, or principals of Government Degree Colleges, Class I (Civil Service/Academia)

Critique

Criticism

Poor performance on international ratings 

Professor Bibek Debroy and Laveesh Bhandari asserted in their book "Corruption in India: The DNA and RNA" that public officials in India are misappropriating as much as 5 per cent of the GDP or   through corruption.

A 2009 survey of the leading economies of Asia, revealed Indian bureaucracy to be not only the least efficient among Singapore, Hong Kong, Thailand, South Korea, Japan, Malaysia, Taiwan, Vietnam, China, Philippines and Indonesia, but also that working with India's civil servants was a "slow and painful" process.

A 2012 study by the Hong Kong-based Political and Economic Risk Consultancy ranked and rated Indian bureaucracy as the worst in Asia with a 9.21 rating out of 10. According to the study, India's inefficient and corrupt bureaucracy was responsible for most of the complaints that business executive have about the country.

A 2013 EY (Ernst & Young) Study reports the industries most vulnerable to corruption are: Infrastructure & Real Estate, Metals & Mining, Aerospace & Defence, and Power & Utilities.

Inefficiency and misalignment with strategic national goals

Institutionalised corruption 

A paper prepared in 2012 by the Ministry of Personnel, Public Grievances and Pensions states that corruption is prevalent at all levels in civil services and it is institutionalised.

Bribery 
A 2005 study done by the Transparency International in India found that more than 92% of the people had firsthand experience of paying bribes or peddling influence to get services performed in a public office.  Taxes and bribes are common between state borders; Transparency International estimates that truckers annually pay  in bribes. There have been several cases of collusion involving officials of the Income Tax Department of India for preferential tax treatment and relaxed prosecutions in exchange for bribes.

Criminalisation 

In 2011, over a period of preceding three years more than 450 chargesheets for criminal cases of corruption were filed and a total of 943 corruption cases were at different stages of investigation by CBI against civil servants.

Misappropriation of funds 

 losses through corruption, waste and fraud occurred from the government's National Rural Health Mission healthcare programme, several of arrested high-level public servants died under mysterious circumstances including one in prison.

Tendering processes and awarding contracts

World Bank report stated that the aid programmes are beset by corruption, bad administration and under-payments. As an example, the report cites that only 40% of grain handed out for the poor reaches its intended target. The World Bank study finds that the public distribution programmes and social spending contracts have proven to be a waste due to corruption.

A 2006 report stated that the state-funded construction activities, such as road building were dominated by construction mafias, consisting of cabals of corrupt public works officials, materials suppliers, politicians and construction contractors.

Theft of state property 

Corrupt officials steal the state property. In cities and villages throughout India, groups of municipal and other government officials, elected politicians, judicial officers, real estate developers and law enforcement officials, acquire, develop and sell land in illegal ways.

Political interference 

Interference by politicians and politicians-babus nexus in corruption is an ongoing concern. In October 2013, the Supreme Court of India, in the case of TSR Subramanian & Ors vs Union of India & Ors  ordered both Government of India and State governments to ensure fixed tenure to civil servants. The court asked senior bureaucrats to write down the oral instructions from politicians so that a record would be kept of all the decisions. This judgement was seen on the similar lines of the Supreme Court's 2006 judgement in Prakash Singh case on police reforms. The judgement was welcomed by various bureaucrats and the media who hoped that it will help in giving freedom and independence to the functioning of bureaucracy.

Reforms

Central Civil Services Authority
In order to professionalise the Civil Services, then Defence Minister A. K. Antony led in decision on creation of a Central Civil Services Authority (CCSA) to oversee the higher bureaucracy.

Alignment with strategic national goals 
Under Prime Minister Narendra Modi's principle of "minimum government and maximum governance", government undertook several reforms to align country's civil service with the strategic national goals, including lateral entry, forcibly retiring inept and corrupt officers, etc. Previously, newly hired IAS officers were deployed directly in the state cadres. From 2014, to align civil servants to the government's agenda, they are first deployed within the central government ministries as assistant secretaries for a few years. From 2020–21, government will conduct common foundation course for all Group A services to counter the attitude of elite clique operating in silos. Doing away with the earlier discriminatory practice of appointing only IAS officers in the central government, officers from other services with domain experience also are empanelled and appointed; this is said to have widened the pool for selection of competent domain experts.

360 degree appraisal 
In 2014, to align the country's civil service systems with the strategic national goals, government implemented a new 360 degree appraisal system which entails "Annual Confidential Report" (ACR), review of work-related attitude and behavior based on confidential feedback from peers, subordinates, and outsiders stakeholders who have dealt with the officer. This new system replaced the earlier archaic annual performance appraisal based solely on the ACR written by an officer's boss.

Lateral entry of domain experts 
From 2018, to attract the best domain expert candidates from across the world for the senior civil servants job, vacancies which were earlier available only through promotion of officers were opened for direct hire or lateral entry as well. This was said to "boost the ministry or department's capabilities and proficiency... [and] provide synergies to policy and implementation". Initially, domain experts lateral entry candidates were appointed to 10 posts out of total 450 posts of joint secretary in the central government, and a further 40 lateral entrants at the director and deputy secretary level were also inducted.

Removal and punishment of corrupt officers

Empowerment of citizens to sue corrupt officers 
In 2016, the government decided to empower citizens to seek prosecution of corrupt IAS officers. The Department Personnel and Training (DoPT), Ministry of Personnel, Public Grievances and Pensions, has accepted to receive requests from private persons seeking sanction for prosecution in respect of IAS officers without any proper proposal and supporting documents.  In 2019, Government of India dismissed 12 (IRS IT) and 15 (IRS Customs and Central Excise) officers for corruption and bribery charges.

Forced retirement of corrupt and inept officers 

In 2011, the Department of Personnel and Training (DoPT), Ministry of Personnel, Public Grievances and Pensions, created a proposal to retire and remove incompetent, inefficient and unproductive All India Service officers after 15 years of service, which was accepted and rule 16(3) of the All India Services (death-cum-retirement benefits) Rules of 1958 was amended on 31 January 2012.

In 2016, the Ministry of Finance dismissed 72 and prematurely retired another 33 Indian Revenue Service officers for the first time for non-performance and on disciplinary grounds.

In 2019, to send a message that the job posting with government bureaucracy is no longer "permanent for the dishonest, corrupt and inefficient" officers, the government fired 22 corrupt officers from the Indian Revenue Service (IRS) and another 284 Central Secretariat Service officers were under performance audit by a review panel headed by the Cabinet Secretary.

See also
 Order of Precedence of India
 Indian Civil Service
 Chattopadhyay, Sreeparna. "Bureaucracy in India: A Pre-Independence History". Journal of Indian Institute of Public Administration - Regional Branch, Odisha - The Civil Service in India: New Perspectives 29 (2022): 148-59.

Notes

References

External links

Official
 UPSC Union Public Service Commission, India
 7th Pay Commission chief recommends 'One Rank, One Pension' for Govt employees by The Indian Express
 Prime Minister instructs DoPT for speedy empanelment of officers from all central services by The Times of India

All India Civil Services
 The All India Services Conduct Rules of 1968

Central Civil Services
 The Central Civil Services Conduct Rules of 1964
 Central Secretariat Manual of Office Procedure 14th Edition by Ministry of Personnel, Public Grievances and Pensions

Others
 Governance in India
 Civil Service Reform in India - Problems and Reforms

 
Ministry of Personnel, Public Grievances and Pensions